JSN may refer to:

 Jesuit Schools Network
 Council for Mass Media in Finland
 National Salvation Junta
 Jaxon Smith-Njigba, American football player